The Russian Federation competed at the 1996 Summer Olympics in Atlanta, Georgia, USA. It was the first time since 1912 that the nation participated separately from the other former countries of the Soviet Union. Russia had been a member of the Unified Team at the 1992 Summer Olympics together with 11 post-Soviet states. 390 competitors, 232 men and 158 women, took part in 212 events in 25 sports.

Medalists

Results by event

Archery

The highest-placing archer was Rita Galinovskaya, at 14th place.
Men

Women

Athletics

Men

Women

Badminton

Men

Women

Mixed

Basketball

Women's tournament
Roster

Preliminary round

Quarterfinal

Classification 5-8

Final 5-6

Boxing

Canoeing

Slalom

Men

Flatwater

Men

Women

Cycling

Mountain biking

Women

Road
Men

Women

Track
Time trials

Sprints

Pursuits

Points Races

Diving

Men

Women

Fencing

Fifteen fencers, nine men and six women, represented Russia in 1996.

Men

Women

Gymnastics

Artistic 
Men

Women

Rhythmic

Handball

Men's team

Preliminary round

Classification 5-6 places

Judo 

Men

Women

Modern pentathlon 

Men

Rowing 

Men

Women

Sailing 

Men

Mixed

Shooting 

Men

Women

Swimming 

Men

Women

Synchronized swimming

Table tennis 

Men

Women

Tennis 

Men

Women

Volleyball

Indoor
Men's team

 Head coach: Viacheslav Platonov
Preliminary round

Quarterfinals

Semifinals

Bronze medal match

Women's team

 Head coach: Nikolay Karpol
Preliminary round

Quarterfinals

Semifinals

Bronze medal match

Water polo 

Men's team
Vladimir Karabutov, Dmitry Gorshkov, Nikolay Kozlov, Dmitri Douguine, Serguei Garbouzov, Nikolai Maximov, Alexander Yerishev, Dmitri Apanasenko, Sergey Ivlev, Ilya Konstantinov, Aleksey Panfili, Sergey Yevstigneyev, Yury Smolovoy

Preliminary round

Quarterfinals

Classification 5/8 place

Classification 5/6 place

Weightlifting 

Men

Wrestling 

Men's Freestyle

Men's Greco-Roman

References

Nations at the 1996 Summer Olympics
1996
Summer Olympics